Shelly A. Glover, PC (born January 2, 1967) is a former member of the Winnipeg Police Service and former politician. Following the 2008 federal election, she became the first policewoman to become a Member of Parliament in Canadian history, representing the riding of Saint Boniface, Manitoba, which she represented until 2015.

A member of the Conservative Party, she served in the cabinet of former Prime Minister Stephen Harper, appointed as Parliamentary Secretary to the Minister of Finance in January 2011, then as the Minister of Canadian Heritage and Official Languages in 2013. Glover served as a member of the Winnipeg Police Service for almost 19 years prior to her election, rising to the rank of sergeant. She was on leave of absence from the police force while serving in Ottawa.

Personal life
Glover is fluent in both English and French, and self-identifies as a Manitoba Métis. She is married to Bruce, a retired police officer and small business owner; they have five children.

Federal politics
Running under the Conservative Party, Glover ran for and won the electoral district of Saint Boniface, Manitoba, in the 2008 federal election from incumbent Liberal Raymond Simard by over 4,500 votes. She thereby became the first policewoman to become a Member of Parliament in Canadian history.

On November 7, 2008, Glover was named Parliamentary Secretary for Official Languages by Prime Minister Stephen Harper. She was re-elected in a rematch with Simard in the 2011 election, the first time in the riding's history that a centre-right MP had been reelected. Glover did not stand for re-election in 2015.

Election spending controversy
The Speaker of the House of Commons received a request from Elections Canada to suspend Glover as an MP in June 2013. Glover failed to file documents related to the 2011 election campaign. Elections Canada spokesman John Enright said, "Those letters advised the speaker that an elected candidate shall not continue to sit or vote as members of the House of Commons pending the filing of complete and accurate returns." Glover filed a legal challenge in the Manitoba Court of Queen's Bench. Liberal MP Scott Andrews indicated the suspension of Glover from Parliament should be immediate according to previous legal precedent. On July 22, 2014, it was reported in the media that Glover's staffers had attempted to remove the controversial election spending information from her Wikipedia page.

In July 2013, it was reported that Glover had filed a revised return, which Elections Canada accepted. Her campaign acknowledged that, as a result of "inadvertence and an honest misunderstanding of what constitutes an election expense," it exceeded the legal limit by $2,267. Glover promised to make up for the overspend by a corresponding underspend in the next election, and was not penalised.

Minister of Canadian Heritage and Official Languages
Shelly Glover was appointed Minister of Canadian Heritage and Official Languages on July 15, 2013.

On October 8, 2013, on behalf of Glover, Daryl Kramp, Member of Parliament (Prince Edward-Hastings), announced support for the Tsi Kionhnheht Ne Onkwawenna Language Circle (TKNOLC) to develop Mohawk language-learning tools.

After federal politics
Glover resigned from the Winnipeg Police Service in April 2018, writing in her letter that the service became a "toxic workplace" for her and that "the WPS is no longer a healthy environment."

Provincial politics
On August 25, 2021, Glover announced her candidacy in the 2021 Progressive Conservative Party of Manitoba leadership election. On September 16, she was confirmed as one of two candidates appearing on the ballot, alongside Heather Stefanson. She lost the party leadership election by 363 votes.

Electoral record

Honours

 On July 15, 2013 Glover was appointed as a member of the Queen's Privy Council for Canada, giving her the honorific title "The Honourable" and post-nominal letters "PC" for life.

References

External links
Shelly Glover

1967 births
Members of the House of Commons of Canada from Manitoba
Canadian Métis people
Canadian police officers
Women members of the House of Commons of Canada
Conservative Party of Canada MPs
Living people
Métis politicians
Politicians from Saskatoon
Politicians from Winnipeg
University of Winnipeg alumni
Women in Manitoba politics
Canadian women police officers
Indigenous Members of the House of Commons of Canada
Members of the 28th Canadian Ministry
Women government ministers of Canada
21st-century Canadian women politicians